Henri Kontinen and Andreas Siljeström were the defending champions, but they did not compete that year.
Ken Skupski and Neal Skupski won the title, defeating Norbert Gombos and Adam Pavlásek in the final, 6–3, 7–6(7–3).

Seeds

Draw

Draw

References
 Main Draw

Slovak Open - Doubles
2014 Doubles